Francisco Torres Grijalba (1585 – 4 September 1662) was a Roman Catholic prelate who served as Bishop of Mondoñedo (1648–1662).

Biography
Francisco Torres Grijalba was born in Madrid, Spain and ordained a priest in the Order of Saint Augustine. On 13 January 1648, he was selected by the King of Spain and confirmed by Pope Innocent X as Bishop of Mondoñedo. On 29 March 1648, he was consecrated by Diego Arce Reinoso, Bishop of Plasencia with Miguel Avellán, Auxiliary Bishop of Toledo, serving as co-consecrator. He served as Bishop of Mondoñedo until his death on 4 September 1662. While bishop, he served as the primary co-consecrator of Juan Pérez de Vega, Bishop of Tui.

References 

1585 births
1662 deaths
16th-century Roman Catholic bishops in Spain
Bishops appointed by Pope Innocent X
Augustinian bishops
People from Madrid